WFUN-LD (channel 48) is a low-power Spanish-language independent television station in Miami, Florida, United States. It is owned by América CV Station Group, Inc., alongside fellow independent station WJAN-CD (channel 41). The two stations share studios in Hialeah Gardens; WFUN-LD's transmitter is located on West Hallandale Beach Boulevard in the Carver Ranches section of West Park.

History
The station's license application was first submitted to the Federal Communications Commission (FCC) in 1980, but a construction permit was not issued until 1988, with a license issued the following year as W27AQ. Owned by Skinner Broadcasting, channel 27 was intended to be a low-power independent TV station branded as "WFUN-TV" and aimed at Broward County. The station, approved to place its transmitter atop the Pompano Beach Club, would have aired sports, financial and other programming.

When W27AQ signed on April 27, however, it did not air its own programming. Instead, it was leased to new CBS affiliate WCIX to serve areas of Broward County that its Homestead-based analog signal could not. In the immediate wake of Hurricane Andrew, which collapsed the Homestead tower, W27AQ remained on the air as WCIX's only broadcast signal. WCIX's translator network remained with the channel 6 facility after the 1995 swap between it and WTVJ.

In June 1998, the station ceased rebroadcasting WTVJ. It moved to UHF channel 48 and its call letters were changed to W48CI. In early 1999, its calls were changed to WFUN-LP; the station license was later upgraded to Class A status and its calls were altered to WFUN-CA in 2002, before reverting to LPTV status in 2004. In 2009, WFUN flash-cut its digital signal into operation on UHF channel 48.

The station has been through several ownership changes, though some of these transfers in the early 2000s appear to be within the Rodriguez family. On August 13, 2012, WFUN-LD acquired the América TeVé programming and format from WJAN-CD (channel 41) after the latter station became a charter affiliate of MundoFox; most of the América CV-owned stations that joined MundoFox on that date added the América TeVé format on their second digital subchannels, with the exception of Puerto Rico-based WKPV and WIRS, which broadcast TeVé on their main channels. However, MundoFox's affiliation with WJAN/WFUN would end on December 28, 2012, as the network moved its Miami affiliation to Key West-based WGEN-TV (channel 8).

Due to the loss of the MundoFox affiliation, on January 28, 2013, WJAN-CD and WFUN-LD launched a new programming format called Teveo, which is stylized as a 24-hour news channel that airs each weekday from 5:00 p.m. to 12:00 a.m. and weekends from 7:00 to 11:00 p.m. "Teveo" carries all of the station's live newscasts, along with rebroadcasts of its 6:00 and 11:00 p.m. newscasts and its public affairs programs including A Mano Limpia and Sevcec a Fondo. It also added live weekday hour-long 7:00 and 9:00 p.m. newscasts on that date, making it the only station in South Florida with newscasts in those timeslots (the 9:00 p.m. newscast was canceled on April 12, 2013, to make way for a news/talk program that debuted the following Monday). On weekends, "Teveo" carries a "week-in-review" selection of its news programs. Paid programming is shown at other times of the day. The channel is simulcast on WFUN-DT2, and is carried on Comcast channel 82, Atlantic Broadband channel 3 and AT&T U-verse channel 41. Nationally, WFUN-LD1 is available via streaming on channel 1106 on The Roku Channel's live TV service.

News operation
WFUN-LD presently broadcasts 17½ hours of locally produced news and talk programming each week (with 3½ hours each weekday); WFUN-LD's news department, whose newscasts are titled América Noticias, only produces local newscasts on weeknights, with no live news broadcasts on weekends. In addition, the station produces the newsmagazine Arrebatados (which airs weekdays at 4:00 p.m.) and two news/talk programs, Sevcec a Fondo (which airs weeknights at 8:00 p.m.) and A Mano Limpia (which airs weeknights at 9:00 p.m.).

WFUN-LD is the last station in the Miami–Fort Lauderdale market to produce its local newscasts in 4:3 standard definition—even though, as of April 2013, select programs are broadcast in high definition, the station maintains HD camera equipment, and on-air graphics and station promos are presented in the format. All of the station's live newscasts are also shown on Teveo, the station's 24-hour news format, each weekday from 5:00 p.m. to 12:00 a.m. and weekends from 7:00 to 11:00 p.m.

Technical information

Subchannels

References

FUN-LD
Television channels and stations established in 1998
Low-power television stations in the United States
FUN-LD
1998 establishments in Florida
Hispanic and Latino American culture in Miami